The 1993–94 UC Irvine Anteaters men's basketball team represented the University of California, Irvine during the 1993–94 NCAA Division I men's basketball season. The Anteaters were led by third year head coach Rod Baker and played at the Bren Events Center and were members of the Big West Conference.

Previous season 
The 1992–93 UC Irvine Anteaters men's basketball team finished the season with a record of 6–21 and 4–14 in Big West play.

Roster

Schedule

|-
!colspan=9 style=|Regular Season

|-
!colspan=9 style=| Big West Conference tournament

Source

References

UC Irvine Anteaters men's basketball seasons
UC Irvine
UC Irvine Anteaters
UC Irvine Anteaters